Tricalcium aluminate Ca3Al2O6, often formulated as 3CaO·Al2O3 to highlight the proportions of the oxides from which it is made, is the most basic of the calcium aluminates.  It does not occur in nature, but is an important mineral phase in Portland cement.

Properties
Pure tricalcium aluminate is formed when the appropriate proportions of finely divided calcium oxide and aluminium oxide are heated together above 1300 °C. The pure form is cubic, with unit cell dimension 1.5263 nm and has density 3064 kg·m−3.  It melts with decomposition at 1542 °C. The unit cell contains 8 cyclic Al6O1818− anions, which can be considered to consist of 6 corner sharing AlO4 tetrahedra. The structure of pure liquid tricalcium aluminate contains mostly AlO4 tetrahedra in an infinite network, with a slightly higher concentration of bridging oxygens than expected from the composition and around 10% unconnected AlO4 monomers and Al2O7 dimers.

In Portland cement clinker, tricalcium aluminate occurs as an "interstitial phase", crystallizing from the melt.  Its presence in clinker is solely due to the need to obtain liquid at the peak kiln processing temperature (1400–1450 °C), facilitating the formation of the desired silicate phases.  Apart from this benefit, its effects on cement properties are mostly undesirable.  It forms an impure solid solution phase, with 15-20% of the aluminium atoms replaced by silicon and iron, and with variable amounts of alkali metal atoms replacing calcium, depending upon the availability of alkali oxides in the melt.  The impure form has at least four polymorphs:

Typical chemical compositions are:

Effect on cement properties
In keeping with its high basicity, tricalcium aluminate reacts most strongly with water of all the calcium aluminates, and it is also the most reactive of the Portland clinker phases.  Its hydration to phases of the form Ca2AlO3(OH) leads to the phenomenon of "flash set" (instantaneous set), and a large amount of heat is generated.  To avoid this, Portland-type cements include a small addition of calcium sulfate (typically 4-8%).  Sulfate ions in solution lead to the formation of an insoluble layer of ettringite (3CaO • Al2O3 • 3CaSO4 over the surface of the aluminate crystals, passivating them.  The aluminate then reacts slowly to form the AFm phase 3CaO • Al2O3 • CaSO4  These hydrates contribute little to strength development.

Tricalcium aluminate is associated with three important effects that can reduce the durability of concrete:
 heat release, which can cause spontaneous overheating in large masses of concrete.  Where necessary, tricalcium aluminate levels are reduced to control this effect.
 sulfate attack, in which sulfate solutions to which the concrete is exposed react with the AFm phase to form ettringite.  This reaction is expansive, and can disrupt mature concrete.  Where concrete is to be placed in contact with, for example, sulfate-laden ground waters, either a "sulfate-resisting" cement (with low levels of tricalcium aluminate) is used, or slag is added to the cement or to the concrete mix.  The slag contributes sufficient aluminium to suppress formation of ettringite.
 delayed ettringite formation, where concrete is cured at temperatures above the decomposition temperature of ettringite (about 65 °C).  On cooling, expansive ettringite formation takes place.

Because they are even more basic, the alkali-loaded polymorphs are correspondingly more reactive.  Appreciable amounts (>1%) in cement make set control difficult, and the cement becomes excessively hygroscopic.  The cement powder flowability is reduced, and air-set lumps tend to form.  They withdraw water from gypsum on storage of the cement, leading to false set.  For this reason, their formation is avoided wherever possible.  It is more energetically favorable for sodium and potassium to form sulfates and chlorides in the kiln, but if insufficient sulfate ion is present, any surplus alkalis congregate in the aluminate phase.  The feed and fuel in the kiln system are preferably controlled chemically to keep the sulfate and alkalis in balance.  However, this stoichiometry is only maintained if there is substantial surplus oxygen in the kiln atmosphere: if "reducing conditions" set in, then sulfur is lost as SO2, and reactive aluminates start to form.  This is readily monitored by tracking the clinker sulfate level on an hour-to-hour basis.

Hydration steps
Water reacts instantly with tricalcium aluminate. Hydration likely begins already during grinding of cement clinker due to residual humidity and dehydration of gypsum additives. Initial contact with water causes protonation of single bonded oxygen atoms on aluminate rings and leads to the formation of calcium hydroxide. The next steps in the sequence of the hydration reaction involve the generated hydroxide ions as strong nucleophiles, which fully hydrolyze the ring structure in combination with water.

References

Cement
Calcium compounds
Aluminates